Prensa Ibérica Media, S.L., or simply Prensa Ibérica, is a Spanish mass media company owned by Javier Moll. It primarily owns regional newspapers.

History 
Founded by Javier Moll, the company traces back its origins to 1978, with the creation of Prensa Canaria, the editor of the morning newspaper La Provincia and the evening newspaper Diario de Las Palmas. It also purchased the Faro de Vigo. The group consolidated together with its rival Vocento as the two largest regional media holdings in Spain.

The company purchased Grupo Zeta in 2019, adding newspapers such as El Periódico de Catalunya, El Periódico de Aragón, El Periódico Extremadura, La Crónica de Badajoz, Córdoba, Mediterráneo, Sport and La Grada. In 2021, Prensa Ibérica decided to move its headquarters from Barcelona to L'Hospitalet de Llobregat. In June 2021, the group hired  to launch a new newspaper based in Madrid, later disclosed to be named as El Periódico de España.

Assets 

Daily newspapers

Weekly newspapers
  ''
Local television stations
 Levante TV
 Información TV

See also 
 Mass media in Spain

References 
Informational notes

Citations

 

1984 establishments in Spain
Conglomerate companies of Spain
Mass media companies established in 1984
Newspaper companies
Mass media companies of Spain